Cumbayá is a rural parish of the Metropolitan District of Quito in the Pichincha Province, Ecuador. It is located east of Quito, in the Tumbaco Valley northwest of the Ilaló volcano, in the San Pedro River valley, a tributary of the Guayllabamba River.

Climate 
At an elevation of 2200 m (7200 ft) above sea level, Cumbayá is lower than Quito and its climate is about 2 to 5 degrees Celsius warmer. Weather is semi tropical year-round,  with a short rainy season.

Developments 
In the years up to 2008, the parish has become a commuter town of Quito as a significant number of middle-upper and higher class families moved from the city to live a more suburban lifestyle. A significant amount of expensive and luxurious properties of Quito can be found in Cumbaya making it the highest income area in the country. This shift in population has attracted investors and entrepreneurs to the area, boosting the local economy. In 2017 there has been commercial activity centered around restaurants ranging from food trucks to gourmet-style places. The town is also characterized by many gated communities that vary in size and wealth.

Cumbayá has become home to the main campus of the Universidad San Francisco de Quito. International students of the campus are placed in host families in Quito for cultural immersion. Quorum Quito, built in the late eighties and located in Paseo San Francisco in the Cumbayá Valley gathered parliamentarians from all over the world at the assemblee of the Interparliamentary Union in 2013.

Architecture 
Examples of architecture drawing from the area's rural beginnings include the Iglesia de Cumbayá in the Main Square and the Iglesia de Miravalle built in 1987. Modern examples include the Rancho San Francisco complex, Paseo San Francisco, La Esquina, Centro Plaza, Scala and Villa Cumbayá shopping centers, among new office blocks.

Traffic and tourism 
The Túnel Oswaldo Guayasamín, named after the revered Quito born painter and sculptor Oswaldo Guayasamín, is the longest vehicular tunnel in Ecuador at 1.5 kilometres and connects the parish with the Iñaquito urban parish of the city of Quito.

In 2004, the Chaquiñán rail trail from Cumbayá to the parish of Puembo, 20 kilometres to the northeast was re-opened.

References

Parishes of Quito Canton